Rose Alice Reynolds (born 21 February 1991) is a British actress and singer. She is most known for her roles as Sarah Durkin in Wasted, Betty Carkeek in Poldark and Alice in Once Upon a Time. Alongside these roles, she has also appeared in episodes of the BBC soap operas Doctors and EastEnders.

Early life
Reynolds was born in Exeter, Devon where her family still resides.

She graduated from the Guildhall School of Music and Drama in 2012. She has also studied performing arts at the Stage by Stage Academy in Exeter.

Career
Reynolds has spent many years of her acting career working in stage productions, which include Tiger Tail, Candide, Twelfth Night, and My Children! My Africa!.

In 2013, Reynolds received a Commendation at the Ian Charleson Awards for her 2012 performance as Lavinia in Titus Andronicus at the Royal Shakespeare Company. A year later, Reynolds appeared in an episode of the BBC soap opera Doctors as Paula Abbot.

In 2017, Reynolds portrayed both Alice and Tilly on the series Once Upon a Time. In 2022, she played Glenda Mitchell in an episode of the BBC soap opera EastEnders.

Filmography

References

External links

1991 births
Living people
British film actresses
British stage actresses
British television actresses
British Shakespearean actresses
Actors from Exeter
Actresses from Devon
English soap opera actresses
21st-century English actresses
Alumni of the Guildhall School of Music and Drama